Tilting at windmills is an English idiom which means "attacking imaginary enemies", originating from Miguel de Cervantes' novel Don Quixote. 

Tilting at windmills may also refer to:

Art, entertainment, and media

Literature
The Eternal Quest (2003), also known as Tilting at Windmills, a novel by Julian Branston
Tilting at Windmills: How I Tried to Stop Worrying and Love Sport, a 2002 book by Andy Miller

Music
Tilting at Windmills (2005), an album by Dive Dive
"Tilting at Windmills", a song by Weddings, Parties, Anything  from the album Roaring Days  (1988)
"Tilting at Windmills", a song by The Field Mice from the album For Keeps (1991)
"Tilting Against Windmills", a song by Protest the Hero from the album Volition (2013)

Other uses
Tilting at Windmills, a training program developed by Richard Pimentel to teach government agencies how to integrate people with disabilities